"Feeling Good" is a 1964 song written by Anthony Newley and Leslie Bricusse for the musical The Roar of the Greasepaint—the Smell of the Crowd, recorded by many artists.

Feeling Good or Feelin' Good may also refer to:

Music

Albums
Feelin' Good (David Ruffin album), 1969
Feelin' Good (Gerry Mulligan album), 1965
Feelin' Good (Lena Horne album), 1965
Feelin' Good (Nightmares on Wax album), 2013
Feelin' Good (Sarah Vaughan album), 1972
Feelin' Good (The Three Sounds album), 1960
Feeling Good (Art Blakey album), 1986
Feeling Good (Julie London album), 1965
Feeling Good (Roy Ayers album), 1982

Songs
"Feelin' Good" (Faithless song), 2010
"Hyper Music"/"Feeling Good", by Muse, including a cover of the Newley/Bricusse song, 2001
"Feelin' Good", by Raven, 1969
"Feeling Good", by Infinity, 1998
"Feeling Good", by Sofi Tukker from Birds of Prey: The Album, 2020

Other uses
Feeling Good: The New Mood Therapy, a 1980 book by David D. Burns
 Feeling Good (En pleine forme), a 2010 short film directed by Pierre Étaix
 Feeling Good, a 1974–1975 TV series hosted by Dick Cavett
 "Feeling Good", an episode of Zoboomafoo

See also
Feel Good (disambiguation)
Feels So Good (disambiguation)